Archer is a slab serif typeface designed in 2001 by Tobias Frere-Jones and Jonathan Hoefler for use in Martha Stewart Living magazine. It was later released by Hoefler & Frere-Jones for commercial licensing.

Structure

The typeface is a geometric slab serif, one with a geometric design similar to sans-serif fonts. It takes inspiration from mid-twentieth century designs such as Rockwell.

The face is unique for combining the geometric structure of twentieth-century European slab-serifs but imbuing the face with a domestic, less strident tone of voice. Balls were added to the upper terminals on letters such as C and G to increase its charm. Italics are true italic designs, with flourishes influenced by calligraphy, an unusual feature for geometric slab serif designs. As with many Hoefler & Frere-Jones designs, it was released in a wide range of weights from hairline to bold, reflecting its design goal as a typeface for complex magazines.

Uses
The typeface has been used for, among other things, branding for Wells Fargo and is a main font for the San Francisco Chronicle and Wes Anderson's film The Grand Budapest Hotel.

References

External links
Archer (H&FJ website)

Hoefler & Frere-Jones typefaces
Typefaces designed by Tobias Frere-Jones
Typefaces designed by Jonathan Hoefler
Typefaces and fonts introduced in 2001
Digital typefaces
Typefaces with text figures
Geometric slab-serif typefaces